The Astronomical Observatory of Mallorca (OAM) is an observatory just south of Costitx, Mallorca, Spain.

The observatory was inaugurated in May 1991 and was the first astronomical center in the Balearic Islands autonomous community and province of Spain.

The observatory is a pioneer among Spanish observatories and uses robotic telescopes (four of them located at La Sagra in Andalucia) to discover and track asteroids.

Salvador Sánchez is director of the OAM.
In 2008, asteroid number 128036, discovered at the OAM in 2003, was named after Spanish tennis player Rafael Nadal.
As of 2008, the OAM tracks more than 2,000 asteroids.

There is a large planetarium attached to the observatory, which often runs performances open to the public.  The Open University is one of a number of academic institutions which runs summer schools at the observatory.

In March 2017, the observatory has closed and gone into liquidation. The land will be up for auction at €1.7 million.

List of discovered minor planets

See also 
 
 Miguel Hurtado
 Observatorio Astronómico de La Sagra
 Consell Observatory

References

External links 
 

Astronomical observatories in Spain
Buildings and structures in Mallorca

Space Situational Awareness Programme